Bagh-e Pashmarki (also Romanized as Bāgh-e Pashmarkī) is a village in Mehruiyeh Rural District, in the Central District of Faryab County, Kerman Province, Iran. At the 2006 census, its population was 669, in 141 families.

References 

Populated places in Faryab County